Laurel Grove, Pittsylvania County is an unincorporated community in Pittsylvania County, in the U.S. state of Virginia that once included a post office.

References

bibliography 

 

Unincorporated communities in Virginia
Unincorporated communities in Pittsylvania County, Virginia